Charles Tayler may refer to:

 Charles Foot Tayler (1794–1853), English painter of portrait miniatures
 Charles Benjamin Tayler (1797–1875), Church of England clergyman and writer